Dordogne's 3rd constituency is one of four French legislative constituencies in the department of Dordogne. It is currently represented by Jean-Pierre Cubertafon of the Democratic Movement (MoDem).

Historic representation

Elections

2022

 
 
 
 
 
 
 
 
|-
| colspan="8" bgcolor="#E9E9E9"|
|-

2017

2012

Colette Langlade was elected in the first round, since she received over 50% of the vote, and the turn-out was high enough.

References

External links 
Results of legislative elections from 2002 to 2017 by constituency (Ministry of the Interior) 
Results of legislative elections from 1958 to 2012 by constituency (CDSP Sciences Po) 
Results of elections from 1958 to present by constituency (data.gouv.fr) 

3